Clostridium cellulosi is a Gram-negative and cellulolytic bacterium from the genus Clostridium.

References

 

Bacteria described in 1991
cellulosi